The Honorary Title "Merited Test Navigator of the USSR" was a military and civilian state award of the Soviet Union. It was established on August 14, 1958, by Decree of the Presidium of the Supreme Soviet No. 2523-X, to recognise courage and outstanding service in experimental aviation.  Its statute was confirmed on August 22, 1988, by Decree of the Presidium of the Supreme Soviet No. 9441-XI.  The title ceased to be awarded following the December 1991 dissolution of the Soviet Union.

Award status 
The title was awarded to military and civilian test navigators 1st class of the civilian aircraft industry and of the Ministry of Defence of the USSR, for multiple years of work in researching and testing new aviation technologies.

The Presidium of the Supreme Soviet of the USSR was the main conferring authority of the award, based on recommendations from the Ministry of Defence or from the Ministry of Aviation Industry.

The "Merited Military Test Navigator of the USSR" badge was worn on the right side of the chest and, in the presence of other orders, placed above them.  If worn with honorary titles of the Russian Federation, the latter have precedence.

Award description 

The badge was a 27mm wide by 23mm high silver and nickel polygon with raised edges. At the top of the obverse, the relief inscription "MERITED TEST NAVIGATOR" is in three lines to the left. In the center, there is a gilt tombac image of a jet plane climbing diagonally towards the right, its nose and tail slightly protruding over the edges. At the bottom, the relief inscription "USSR" is superimposed over a laurel branch.

The badge was secured to a standard Soviet square mount by a silver-plated ring through the suspension loop. The mount was covered by a silk moiré blue ribbon.

Notable recipients (partial list)
 Nikolai Stepanovich Zatsepa
 Fedor Makarovich Poptsov
 Serafim Mitrofanovich Uvarkin
 Nikolai Alekseevich Alferov
 Konstantin Ivanovich Malkhasyan
 Colonel Aleksey Parfenovitch Bulanov
 Sergey Georgievich Dzuba
 Sergey Petrovich Aleynikov

See also 

Orders, decorations, and medals of the Soviet Union
Badges and Decorations of the Soviet Union
Soviet Air Force

References

External links 
  Legal Library of the USSR
 The Commission on State Awards to the President of the Russian Federation
  The Russian Gazette

Military awards and decorations of the Soviet Union
Honorary titles of the Soviet Union
Civil awards and decorations of the Soviet Union
Awards established in 1958
Awards disestablished in 1991
1991 disestablishments in the Soviet Union